Dosenbek is an  river of Schleswig-Holstein, Germany.

The origin is in the  Gehege Negenharrie (Gehege may be translated as forest enclosure) in the district Rendsburg-Eckernförde. Most of the water originates from the Dosenmoor. The mouth is close to the Brachenfelder Gehölz in the district Brachenfeld of Neumünster. Here the Dosenbek empties into the Schwale.

See also
List of rivers of Schleswig-Holstein

Rivers of Schleswig-Holstein
Rivers of Germany